Lymm Dam is the name of a dam and lake in Lymm, Cheshire, England, an inset village in the greenbelt around Warrington. It was created in 1824 by a dam built during the construction of what is now the A56 road, when local inhabitants objected to initial plans for a route through the village centre. It may have been used to supply power to local industry, and the surrounding area.

Warrington Borough Council began managing the Lymm Dam and its park in the early 1980s. At that time there were considerable erosion problems and the Ranger Service began to upgrade the existing path network and take over the park maintenance. It is now a popular visitor attraction, which has won several Green Flag Awards for its improvements to the infrastructure and ecology of the dam.

See also

List of parks and open spaces in Cheshire

References

Warrington
Lakes and reservoirs of Cheshire
Dams in England
Dams completed in 1824
Reservoirs in Cheshire